Lougheed is a village in central Alberta, Canada. It is 94 km south-east of Camrose, along Highway 13. The village was named after Sir James Lougheed, an Alberta senator from 1889 to 1925.

Demographics 

In the 2016 Census of Population conducted by Statistics Canada, the Village of Lougheed recorded a population of 256 living in 108 of its 118 total private dwellings, a  change from its 2011 population of 233.

The Village of Lougheed's 2013 municipal census counted a population of 273, a  change from its 2010 municipal census population of 254.

See also 
List of communities in Alberta
List of villages in Alberta

References

External links 

1911 establishments in Alberta
Villages in Alberta